Leptoglanis bouilloni is a species of catfish in the genus Leptoglanis. It is found in the Congo River basin in the Democratic Republic of the Congo. Its length reaches 6.2 cm.

References 

Amphiliidae
Fish described in 1959
Taxa named by Max Poll
Freshwater fish of Central Africa